Elsah Township is one of eleven townships in Jersey County, Illinois, United States. As of the 2010 census, its population was 2,462 and it contained 1,027 housing units.

Geography

Cities, towns, villages
 Elsah

Unincorporated towns
 Beltrees
 Chautauqua
 Lockhaven

Adjacent townships
 Mississippi Township (north)
 Godfrey Township, Madison County (east)
 Quarry Township (west)
 Otter Creek Township (northwest)

Cemeteries
The township contains these three cemeteries: Elsah, Saint Michaels and Wendle.

Major highways
  Illinois Route 3
  Illinois Route 100
  Illinois Route 109

Demographics

School districts
 Alton Community Unit School District 11
 Jersey Community Unit School District 100

Political districts
 Illinois's 19th congressional district
 State House District 97
 State House District 111
 State Senate District 49
 State Senate District 56

References
 
 United States Census Bureau 2007 TIGER/Line Shapefiles
 United States National Atlas

External links
 City-Data.com
 Illinois State Archives

Townships in Jersey County, Illinois
Townships in Illinois